Gerald Hamilton Anderson (April 12, 1922 – October 3, 2003) was a Canadian politician. He served in the Legislative Assembly of British Columbia from 1972 to 1975, as a NDP member for the constituency of Kamloops.

References

1922 births
2003 deaths
British Columbia New Democratic Party MLAs
Politicians from Regina, Saskatchewan